Pankow is a locality (Ortsteil) of Berlin in the district (Bezirk) of Pankow. Until 2001 it was an autonomous district with the localities of Karow, Niederschönhausen, Wilhelmsruh, Rosenthal, Blankenfelde, Buch and Französisch Buchholz.

History
The village of Pankow is named after the small Panke river, a tributary of the Spree. The settlement was first mentioned in a 1311 deed by the Margraves of Brandenburg, though the "Four Evangelists" fieldstone church had already been erected about 1230. In 1691 Elector Frederick III acquired Schönhausen Palace, in neighboring Niederschönhausen, from the heirs of General Joachim Ernst von Grumbkow, which promoted the development of the Pankow village.

As Pankow grew, due to industrialization, in the 19th century, it became a suburb – and popular day-trip destination – of Berlin. It was finally incorporated into the city by the Greater Berlin Act of 1920.

In the East German period, from 1949 to 1990, Pankow, together with  Niederschönhausen, was a prominent quarter of East Berlin. From 1949 to 1960 Schönhausen Palace was the presidential residency of East Germany, and throughout the period many embassies were located in the vicinity.

Geography
Pankow is situated in the south-western side of its district. It borders the localities of Niederschönhausen, Französisch Buchholz, Karow, Heinersdorf, Weissensee, Prenzlauer Berg and Gesundbrunnen. Between 1961 and 1990, the Berlin Wall passed through Pankow (in East Berlin) and Gesundbrunnen (in West Berlin).

Transportation
The locality is served by the Berliner S-Bahn lines S1, S2, S25, S85; by the U-Bahn line U2, and by several lines of tramway.

Photogallery

See also
 Schönhausen Palace
 Berlin-Pankow railway station

References

External links

Localities of Berlin
Populated places established in the 13th century